Playtoons is a series of linked games, released in 1994, which allow players to make their own Animations using a variety of characters, backgrounds, scenery and props from either a single game or a mixture from the full series. The games are focused on teaching children school topics in a digital format meant to be more enthralling for kids.

Included with each game is a cartoon introducing the characters and situations. In addition to playing the story straight through, players can jump to any page in the story, with some of the pages leading to unlisted pages.

Series storylines

Uncle Archibald 
The narrator introduces his friend, Ben, who lives with his Uncle Archibald, who owns a shop. In Archibald's past, he wrote stories about witches, wizards, and monsters. He kept a description of each monster on his computer, which Ben and the narrator, peep at. One monster particularly catches their eye: Ogre Kringle, who eats kids with chocolate sauce.

Later Ben and the narrator are looking for an unnamed secret formula, when they add the contents of "a little green bottle" and there is an explosion. A dense fog moves through the house, and the lights go out. Going to the kitchen, looking for candles, the pair discover a monster looking through the refrigerator, complaining that he was unable to find any chocolate sauce! The pair manage to neutralise Ogre Kringle before he can find the sauce and eat them.

Fearing more of the monsters from the stories, they call Uncle Archibald and tell him everything. There is a loud footstep, and the pair take refuge in the living room. When the lights come on, all the monsters are there laughing at them. Fatso, a large brown monster, grabs them as Uncle Archibald storms in. The monsters, fearing the wrath of their creator, let the two friends go.

Archibald threatens the monsters; that if they did not go back to the stories then he would send them to a soppy love story. The ashamed monsters vanish.

Archibald explains that the little green bottle contained a spell that materialized things that we imagine.

Plus, other stories include "The Big Brag", "The Bippolo Seed", "Horton Hatches the Egg", "The Sneetches", "In the Night Kitchen" and "The Munkits".

The Case of the Counterfeit Collaborator 
Plus, other stories include "It's Not Easy Being a Bunny", "The Rabbit, the Bear, and the Zinniga-Zanniga", "The Great Henry McBride", "If I Ran the Circus", "One Was Johnny" and "Thidwick the Big-Hearted Moose".

The Secret of the Castle 
Plus, other stories include "Tadd and Todd", "The Ruckus", "The Very Bad Bunny", "Scrambled Eggs Super!", "The Zax", "Don and Donna Go to Bat", "Tubby and the Lantern" and "Robert the Rose Horse".

The Mandarin Prince 
Plus, other stories include "The Kindly Snather", "P.J. Funnybunny Camps Out", "Tubby and the Poobah", "Richard Scarry's The Early Bird", "The Hoobub and the Grinch" and "Horton and the Kwuggerbug".

The Stone of Wakan 
Plus, other stories include "How Officer Pat Saved the Whole Town", "Marco Comes Late" and "The Flustards".

See also 
 Disney's Animated Storybook
 Living Books
 Magic Tales

Notes 
 Series names from: NewMedia: Titles, Volume 21, Waterlow New Media Information, (1999) . (Snippet view) Retrieved November 2011.

References

Sierra Entertainment games
Coktel Vision games
Adventure games
1994 video games
1995 video games
Software for children
Animation software
Video game franchises introduced in 1994
Children's educational video games
Playtoons 1: Uncle Urchibald
Playtoons 1: Uncle Urchibald
Video games set in France
Video games set in the Middle Ages
Western (genre) video games
Windows games
Classic Mac OS games
1994 software
Video games developed in France
Video games based on comics